This is a list of piano trios by Wolfgang Amadeus Mozart.

 Kegelstatt Trio in E-flat major K. 498
 Piano Trio No. 1 in B-flat Major K. 254
 Piano Trio No. 2 in G Major K. 496
 Piano Trio No. 3 in B-flat Major K. 502
 Piano Trio No. 4 in E Major K. 542
 Piano Trio No. 5 in C Major K. 548
 Piano Trio No. 6 in G Major K. 564

 
Piano trios